Estadio Unión Tarma is a multi-use stadium in Tarma, Peru. It is currently used mostly for football matches and is the home stadium of Asociación Deportiva Tarma of the Liga 1 Peru. The stadium holds 9,000 spectators.

External links
Stadium information

Union Tarma
Buildings and structures in Junín Region